Malkiel is both a given name and a surname. Notable people with the name include:

Malkiel Ashkenazi, 16th-century Ottoman rabbi
Malkiel Gruenwald, Israeli hotelier, amateur journalist, and stamp collector
Malkiel Kotler, current Rosh Yeshiva of Beth Medrash Govoha
Burton Malkiel (born 1932), American economist and writer
Yakov Malkiel (1914–1998), Russian-born American etymologist and philologist